Cornuticlava kobipoto is a species of moth of the family Tortricidae first described by Józef Razowski in 2013. It is found on Seram Island in Indonesia. The habitat consists of forests at altitudes between 500 and 1,500 meters.

The wingspan is about 18.5 mm. The ground colour of the forewings is glossy white in the terminal area, somewhat sprinkled with black. The markings are brownish black. The hindwings are white.

Etymology
The species name refers to Gunung Kobipoto, the type locality.

References

Moths described in 2013
Schoenotenini